The Lake Michigan Admirals were a team of the Premier Basketball League that began play in the 2009-10 season as a member of the American Basketball Association. The Admirals are the second ABA team based in Berrien County, Michigan, after the Benton Harbor-based Twin City Ballers folded after their only season of 2006-07.  The Admirals played 15 home games, 10 in Lake Michigan Catholic High School in Saint Joseph, Michigan and 5 at Benton Harbor High School in Benton Harbor, Michigan.

The Admirals are owned by Chris Glisson, former co-owner of fellow ABA teams the Smoky Mountain Jam and Tri-City Racers. Glisson hoped to set up a similar arena for the Admirals in time for the 2019 season but failed to do so.   After the team folded, Glisson was arrested in the spring of 2020, while working with the Boys and Girls club for assaulting a student at the high school he was assigned to and subsequently fired from the organization.

The Admirals finished their inaugural 2009-2010 season with 13 wins and 7 losses, with a 122-117 loss to North Division rivals Chicago Steam in the Division Championship Game.  Captain and forward Dominick Melton was named to the ABA East All Star team, with Odgra Bobo, Antonio Griffin and Brandon Ball all honorary mentions in All Star voting.

For the 2012 season, the Admirals joined the Premier Basketball League.

In October 2014, the Admirals signed Bob Wegner, who at 7'8" has claimed to be the world's tallest professional athlete.

In 2015 and 2016, the Admirals were back to back PBL Midwest Champions.

The focus of the Lake Michigan Admirals is to help prepare players mentally, physically, and spiritually before going to the next level. Owner Chris Glisson has helped 86 players get signed to over 58 different countries since 2009.

History season results

 2009-2010 (14-6)
 2010-2011 (22-6)
 2011-2012 (4-14)
 2012-2013 (4-11)
 2013-2014 (6-12)
 2014-2015 (12-4)
 2016 (10-8)

Head coaches
 Michael "Ace" Jackson (2014–present)
 Jonathan Solomon (2014)
 Michael "Ace" Jackson (2012-2013)
 Che' D Eddie (2010–2012)
 Buck Riley (2009-2010)
 Mike Ahrens (2009)
 Buck Riley

2014 roster

2011-12 roster

2010-11 season schedule

References

External links
Lake Michigan Admirals official website

Former Premier Basketball League teams
Basketball teams in Michigan
Berrien County, Michigan
Basketball teams established in 2009
Defunct American Basketball Association (2000–present) teams
2009 establishments in Michigan